Garfield Mountain is a mountain located in the Catskill Mountains of New York south of Allaben. Fork Ridge is located south, Sheridan Mountain is located east-northeast, and Romer Mountain is located southeast of Garfield Mountain.

References

Mountains of Ulster County, New York
Mountains of New York (state)